The Old Harbor Historic District is an historic district in the resort community of New Shoreham on Block Island off the southern coast of Rhode Island. Bounded by the Atlantic Ocean and Main Street, it includes Spring, High, and Water streets as well. There are 42 buildings listed in the district, which was listed on the National Register of Historic Places in 1974.

District buildings

Chapel Street
 Site of First Baptist Church
 Saint Andrews Roman Catholic Church, c.1900

Dodge Street
 Surf Hotel, c. 1876
 Blue Dory Inn, c. 1870
 Drug Store, c. 1870
 Olsen's Cottage, c. 1875
 Rose Store, c. 1875
 Gothic Cottage, c. 1880
 Andrew. Dodge House, c. 1800
 Leslie Dodge House (The Gables Inn), c. 1860
 J. Hooper House, c. 1750
 Mansard House, c. 1875

High Street
 House, c. 1870
 Union Hotel, 1883
 Hartford Hotel, c. 1880
 Mitchell Cottage, c. 1865
 Masonic Lodge, c. 1876
 Perry Cottage, c. 1890
 Bellevue Hotel, c. 1885
 Eureka Hotel, c. 1880
 Highland House, c. 1890

Main Street
 Woonsocket House (Block Island Historical Society), c. 1875
 Woonsocket House (Annex Block Island Inn), c. 1880
 The Yellow Kittens, c. 1890

Spring Street
 Adrian Hotel (First Baptist Church), 1886
 Hotel Manisses, 1882
 1661 Inn, c. 1870
 Rose Cottage, c. 1880
 Atlantic Hotel Norwich Hotel, c. 1880
 House, c. 1885
 Spring House and Annex, 1852/c. 1872

Water Street
 New National Hotel, 1888/1904
 Narragansett Hotel, c. 1875/c. 19O8
 Ocean Cottage New Shoreham Hotel, c. 1875/c. 1910
 Pequot House, 1882
 Odd Fellows Hall, 1872
 Norton's Cottage Dept. Store, c. 189O
 Roller Skating Rink Empire Theatre, c. 188O
 City Drug Store, c. 1880
 C. C. Ball General Store, c. 1880
 Shamrock Inn Ocean View Annex, c. 1875
 Site of Ocean View Hotel

See also
National Register of Historic Places listings in Washington County, Rhode Island

References

Historic districts in Washington County, Rhode Island
New Shoreham, Rhode Island
Historic districts on the National Register of Historic Places in Rhode Island